Heris (also Romanized as Herīs) is a village in Zonuzaq Rural District, in the Central District of Marand County, East Azerbaijan Province, Iran. At the 2006 census, its population was 93, in 26 families.

References 

Populated places in Marand County